This is a list of countries by estimated future gross central government debt based on data released in October 2020 by the International Monetary Fund, with figures in percentage of national GDP.

Projected debt estimates

See also 
 List of countries by public debt

Sources
International Monetary Fund, World Economic Outlook Database of October 2020, for countries: , for the European Union: 

Lists of countries by economic indicator
Government debt by country